The 2012 NBA Finals was the championship series of the National Basketball Association's (NBA) 2011–12 season, and the conclusion of the season's playoffs. The Eastern Conference champion Miami Heat defeated the Western Conference champion Oklahoma City Thunder four games to one to win their second NBA title. Heat forward LeBron James was named the Finals MVP.

The 2012 Finals marked the fourth time in franchise history that the Oklahoma City Thunder played in the NBA Finals. Previously known as the Seattle SuperSonics, the Thunder had not reached the Finals since relocating from Seattle, Washington to Oklahoma City, Oklahoma before the start of the 2008–2009 season. Prior to 2012, the franchise last played in the NBA Finals in 1996 as the SuperSonics, losing to the Michael Jordan-led Chicago Bulls. The 2012 Thunder team was the second-youngest NBA Finals team in history.

The 2012 Finals also marked the Miami Heat's second consecutive appearance in the NBA Finals and its third appearance overall. The Heat appeared in the Finals in 2006, defeating the Dallas Mavericks, and were defeated by the Mavericks in the 2011 Finals.

Background

Miami Heat

This was also their second Finals appearance in the "Big Three" era, being led by superstar LeBron James, shooting guard Dwyane Wade, and power forward Chris Bosh.

In the regular season, the Heat finished with 46 victories, good for second in the Eastern Conference. In the playoffs, they defeated the New York Knicks (4–1), Indiana Pacers (4–2) and Boston Celtics (4–3) on their way to the Finals. Along the way, they managed to overcome serious series deficits that nearly eliminated them from the postseason, but they had strings of victories to let them survive. The first was against the Pacers in the Conference Semifinals when they trailed in the series, 1–2. The Heat responded by taking three straight victories to defeat the Pacers in six games despite losing Chris Bosh to injury. The second was against the Celtics in the Conference Finals when they trailed, 2–3, in the series despite taking a 2-0 series lead. They responded by winning a decisive game 6 in Boston, thanks to an epic performance by LeBron James, and taking game 7 at home to advance to the Finals.

The 2011-2012 Heat team included several new players that had not played for the team during its 2011 Finals run, including Shane Battier, Eddy Curry, Ronny Turiaf, and rookies Terrel Harris and Norris Cole.

Oklahoma City Thunder

This was the Thunder's first NBA Finals appearance since the team relocated from Seattle to Oklahoma City in 2008. Including their seasons as the Seattle SuperSonics, this was also the club's fourth Finals appearance, and first since , when they lost to the Michael Jordan-led Chicago Bulls. The team was seeking their first NBA championship since .

The Thunder finished with 47 wins, second in the Western Conference. During the playoffs, they defeated the defending champion Dallas Mavericks (4–0) in the first round and the Los Angeles Lakers (4–1) in the conference semifinals. In the conference finals, they defeated West’s #1 seeded San Antonio Spurs (4–2) despite losing the first two games. Ironically, the Thunder defeated the last three Western Finalists in sequential order en route to this year’s finals.

The Thunder entered the Finals as the second-youngest finalists in NBA history. In addition, Daequan Cook faced the team that traded him to the Thunder in 2010.

Road to the Finals

Regular season series
The season series was tied, 1–1, with both teams winning at their home floor.

Series summary

Game summaries
All times are in Eastern Daylight Time (UTC−4)

Game 1

The Thunder defeated the Heat, 105–94, in Game 1. Miami held the lead for most of the first three quarters, including a 13-point lead at one point during the second quarter. The Heat made five three-pointers to jump to a 29–22 lead by the end of the first quarter, but Oklahoma City kept on pace with Miami to keep the score at 54–47 by halftime. The Thunder then took the lead for good with 16 seconds left in the third quarter after Russell Westbrook made a free throw to make it 74–73. Kevin Durant led Oklahoma City with 36 points, while Westbrook had 27. LeBron James led the Heat with 30 points, but was held to one basket during the first eight minutes of the fourth quarter.

Game 2

The Heat defeated the Thunder 100-96 in Game 2, tying the series at one game a piece and giving the Thunder their first home playoff loss of the season. Miami never trailed, building a 27–15 first quarter lead, and holding a 17-point advantage at one point. The Thunder attempted a comeback in the fourth quarter, and with 37 seconds left in the game, Oklahoma City's Kevin Durant made a three-pointer to cut the deficit, 98–96. Durant would miss a game-tying jumper in the closing seconds as Miami held off Oklahoma City for the Game 2 win. The play did not come without controversy however as many observers had felt that James had fouled Durant on the right hip during the shot, a potential sixth foul that would have taken the Heat superstar out of the game in the process. LeBron James led the Heat with 32 points, while Durant scored 32 of his own to lead the Thunder.

Game 3

Miami won Game 3, 91-85, to go up two games to one in the series. Miami had a slim 47–46 halftime lead before Oklahoma City began the third quarter with a 10–4 run, eventually building a 10-point lead midway through the period. However, Miami scored the last seven points in the third quarter to regain the lead at 69–67. With 7:36 remaining in the game, the Thunder came back to retake the lead at 77–76, but the Heat then scored eight unanswered points to build an 84–77 advantage with 3:47 left. A 6–0 run by Oklahoma City pulled them within one point of Miami with 90 seconds left, but the Thunder could not score again for the rest of the game while the Heat made five insurance free throws. LeBron James led the Heat with 29 points and 14 rebounds, while Kevin Durant scored 25 points to lead the Thunder.

Game 4

Miami won Game 4, 104–98, to go up three games to one in the series. The Thunder jumped to a 33–19 lead by the end the first quarter, but the Heat rallied to cut the score to 49–46 at halftime, thanks to two huge three-pointers by Heat rookie Norris Cole. The two teams remained neck-and-neck throughout most of the third quarter, with Miami holding a 4-point lead at the start of fourth period. However, for the final 16 minutes of the game, Russell Westbrook (who led the Thunder with 43 points) and Kevin Durant (who had 28 points) were the only two Oklahoma City players able to score. With the other Thunder players struggling to make their shots, Miami was able to pull away in the end, largely thanks to late-game heroics from LeBron James, Mario Chalmers and Dwyane Wade. LeBron James led the Heat with 26 points, including the go ahead three pointer, but had to sit out during the final two minutes of the game due to leg cramps. Mario Chalmers scored 25 points and made two key plays to seal Miami's win: a driving layup around a well-positioned Serge Ibaka and two free throws after a rare mistake by Westbrook (he fouled Chalmers after the point guard recovered Shane Battier's tip on a jump ball with less than 1 minute left, thinking that the shot clock would reset, while NBA rules do not reset at that point in a 4th quarter if the team that previously had the ball re-gains possession off the tip).

Game 5

Miami won Game 5, 121–106, to win the series, four games to one. After keeping it a close game in the first half, the Thunder were outscored 36–22 in the third quarter, with Miami leading as much as 27 at one point. Miami was fueled by strong performances by their "Big Three" of LeBron James, Dwyane Wade, and Chris Bosh, as well as by Mike Miller, who was 7 for 8 for three-pointers, ending the night with 23 points. Miller only entered the game because Wade encountered foul trouble in the first half, with Coach Erik Spoelstra telling the variously-injured veteran the Heat just needed him to hold the fort until the 2nd quarter began; when Miller hit two three-pointers, Spoelstra asked him if he could keep playing and Miller said yes, leading to 23 minutes on the court that were critical in blowing the game open for Miami. The team tied an NBA Finals record for most 3-pointers in a game with 14. With three minutes remaining in the game, both teams took their starters out of the game, with the Heat still leading by more than 20 points. With their Game 5 win, the Heat won their second NBA championship in team history, and the first for several Heat players, including James, who was named the NBA Finals MVP after averaging 28.6 points, 10.2 rebounds and 7.4 assists in the finals, capping it all off with his first triple double of the season in the final game. For the Thunder, Kevin Durant had 32 points, and 11 rebounds; Russell Westbrook had 19 points and 6 assists; and James Harden led the bench with 19 points, 5 assists, and 4 rebounds.

Rosters

Miami Heat

Oklahoma City Thunder

Player statistics

Miami Heat

|-
| align="left" |  || 1 || 0 || 2.1 || .000 || .000 || .000 || 0.0 || 0.0 || 0.0 || 0.0 || 0.0
|-
| align="left" |  || 5 || 5 || 37.5 || .613 || .577 || .714 || 3.4 || 0.4 || 0.8 || 0.0 || 11.6
|-
| align="left" |  || 5 || 4 || 36.6 || .452 || .400 || .882 || 9.4 || 0.2 || 0.6 || 1.2 || 14.6
|-
| align="left" |  || 5 || 5 || 36.5 || .442 || .348 || .857 || 2.6 || 4.0 || 1.8 || 0.4 || 10.4
|-
| align="left" |  || 4 || 0 || 11.0 || .333 || .429 || .000 || 1.0 || 0.0 || 0.0 || 0.0 || 3.3
|-
| align="left" |  || 1 || 0 || 3.0 || .000 || .000 || .750 || 1.0 || 0.0 || 0.0 || 0.0 || 3.0
|-
| align="left" |  || 5 || 1 || 16.3 || .400 || .000 || .833 || 4.4 || 0.4 || 0.0 || 0.4 || 2.6
|-
| align="left" |  || 1 || 0 || 3.0 || .000 || .000 || .000 || 0.0 || 0.0 || 0.0 || 0.0 || 0.0
|-! style="background:#FDE910;"
| align="left" |  || 5 || 5 || 44.1 || .472 || .188 || .826 || 10.2 || 7.4 || 1.6 || 0.4 || 28.6
|-
| align="left" |  || 4 || 0 || 10.7 || .500 || .400 || 1.000 || 1.5 || 0.0 || 0.3 || 0.0 || 2.8
|-
| align="left" |  || 5 || 0 || 8.9 || .563 || .636 || 1.000 || 1.8 || 0.4 || 0.2 || 0.2 || 6.2
|-
| align="left" |  || 1 || 0 || 3.0 || .000 || .000 || .000 || 1.0 || 0.0 || 0.0 || 0.0 || 0.0
|-
| align="left" |  || 5 || 5 || 40.6 || .435 || .400 || .775 || 6.0 || 5.2 || 1.4 || 1.2 || 22.6

Oklahoma City Thunder

|-
| align="left" |  || 1 || 0 || 4.7 || 1.000 || .000 || .000 || 1.0 || 0.0 || 0.0 || 0.0 || 2.0
|-
| align="left" |  || 5 || 0 || 16.6 || .600 || .000 || .000 || 4.6 || 0.6 || 0.6 || 0.2 || 3.6
|-
| align="left" |  || 3 || 0 || 3.5 || .333 || .000 || .000 || 0.0 || 0.3 || 0.0 || 0.0 || 0.7
|-
| align="left" |  || 5 || 5 || 42.6 || .548 || .394 || .839 || 6.0 || 2.2 || 1.4 || 1.0 || 30.6
|-
| align="left" |  || 5 || 0 || 25.6 || .423 || .357 || 1.000 || 1.6 || 0.8 || 1.0 || 0.0 || 5.6
|-
| align="left" |  || 5 || 0 || 32.8 || .375 || .318 || .792 || 4.8 || 3.6 || 1.2 || 0.0 || 12.4
|-
| align="left" |  || 1 || 0 || 4.7 || .500 || .000 || .000 || 2.0 || 0.0 || 0.0 || 0.0 || 2.0
|-
| align="left" |  || 5 || 5 || 26.3 || .424 || .000 || .636 || 5.2 || 0.8 || 0.4 || 2.0 || 7.0
|-
| align="left" |  || 1 || 0 || 3.0 || 1.000 || 1.000 || .000 || 0.0 || 0.0 || 0.0 || 0.0 || 6.0
|-
| align="left" |  || 5 || 5 || 23.2 || .429 || .000 || .750 || 6.8 || 0.0 || 0.2 || 0.6 || 4.8
|-
| align="left" |  || 5 || 5 || 25.9 || .296 || .182 || .833 || 2.0 || 1.0 || 1.4 || 0.8 || 4.6
|-
| align="left" |  || 5 || 5 || 42.3 || .433 || .136 || .824 || 6.4 || 6.6 || 1.0 || 0.4 || 27.0

Broadcast
In the United States, the NBA Finals aired on ABC and Mike Breen and Jeff Van Gundy served as commentators. ESPN Radio aired it as well and had Jim Durham, Jack Ramsey and Hubie Brown as commentators.

References

External links
Official website of the 2012 NBA Finals
2012 NBA Finals at ESPN
2012 NBA Finals at Basketball-Reference.com

National Basketball Association Finals
Finals
NBA Finals
NBA Finals
2010s in Miami
Sports competitions in Miami
NBA
Oklahoma City Thunder games
June 2012 sports events in the United States
ABS-CBN television specials